Zyzomys is a genus of rodents with unusually thick, long tails. Five species of the genus are known in Australia, where they are called rock rats or thick-tailed rats. The genus was classified by Michael Rogers Oldfield Thomas in 1909.

Taxonomy
There are five known species of rock-rat. The central rock rat (Zyzomys pedunculatus) was once believed to be extinct until rediscovered in 1996.

Silver-tailed rock rat, Zyzomys argurus
Arnhem Land rock rat, Zyzomys maini
Carpentarian rock rat, Zyzomys palatilis
Central rock rat, Zyzomys pedunculatus
Kimberley rock rat, Zyzomys woodwardi

References

 
Rodent genera
Taxa named by Oldfield Thomas